Maggie Chapman (born 27 June 1979) is a Zimbabwe Rhodesia-born Scottish politician and lecturer who is a Scottish Green Member of the Scottish Parliament (MSP) for North East Scotland. She was co-convenor of the Scottish Greens from November 2013 to August 2019, serving with Patrick Harvie, and was the party's lead candidate for the 2019 European election.

She was a councillor for the Leith Walk ward of The City of Edinburgh Council from 2007 to 2015 and represented the Scottish Greens on the Smith Commission for further devolution of powers to the Scottish Parliament.

Chapman was the Rector of the University of Aberdeen, having been elected in 2014, and again in 2018. Her term ended on the 31 March 2021.

She was the lead Green candidate for the North East region at the 2021 Scottish Parliament election, and was elected as one of eight Green MSPs.

Early life and education
Chapman was born in 1979 in Salisbury, Zimbabwe Rhodesia. Her family had moved from South Africa in 1978 for her father to take up the post of director at the college of music. She grew up there, educated at a mixed-race school, with the country having achieved independence from the United Kingdom as the Republic of Zimbabwe whilst she was a baby. Her mother was a nurse who worked as a theatre sister and midwife.

Chapman moved to Scotland to study Zoology at the University of Edinburgh, graduating in 2001. She went on to complete a Master's degree in Environmental Management at the University of Stirling in 2003, then returned to Edinburgh University to study for a PhD in Geography. In 2015, she clarified that she had not completed her doctoral studies. As a student, she had been an activist for Edinburgh University Students' Association.

Professional life
Chapman has worked in the west of Scotland in Environmental Management, and as a community carer throughout Edinburgh.

Until June 2015 she was a lecturer in cultural geography, environmental ethics and social justice at Edinburgh Napier University. She retains a role in teaching through her support for the Educational Institute of Scotland.

In mid-2015 she took up a post at the Muslim Women's Resource Centre in Dundee.

Political career
Chapman was first elected as a councillor for the Leith Walk ward in the 2007 City of Edinburgh Council election, becoming one of the three first Green councillors in Edinburgh. She was re-elected in 2012. Later that year she became the first ever convener of the council's Petitions Committee. During her time as a councillor, Chapman has advocated for causes that include: the living wage, participatory budgeting, better private tenancy rights, and better support for non-profits. She has also organised and voted against the privatisation of council services and cuts to services. In June 2015, she announced she was standing down as a councillor, to concentrate on the Scottish Parliament election that was to be held in May 2016. She was selected as the party's lead candidate for the North East region.

In November 2013, she was elected unopposed as the Scottish Greens' female co-convenor, succeeding Glasgow councillor Martha Wardrop, and was re-elected to the position in 2016.

Chapman was the party's lead candidate in the 2014 European Parliament election in the United Kingdom for the Scotland constituency. She was not elected.

Chapman is a socialist, environmentalist, anti-cuts activist, peace activist and feminist. She has been active in a number of political campaigns, including the Radical Independence Campaign.

In September 2014, Chapman became a member of the Smith Commission into further devolution for the Scottish Parliament.

She stood in the 2016 Scottish Parliament election as the party's lead candidate for the North East region but despite the Greens increasing their number of MSPs from two to six, Chapman was not elected.

In 2019, she was once again selected as the party's lead candidate for the European Parliament election for the Scotland constituency. She was not elected.

At the 2019 Scottish Green leadership election, Chapman lost to Lorna Slater.

In the 2021 Scottish Parliament election, Chapman lead the North East regional list for the Scottish Greens. Her successful election to Holyrood was announced on 8 May 2021, two days after the election. This made her the first Green MSP in the North East since Shiona Baird lost her seat in 2007. Upon being sworn in, Chapman repeated her affirmation in Shona.

Rector
In November 2014, she was elected as Rector of the University of Aberdeen after a vote by the student body of the University. She was installed as rector at a ceremony in March 2015, having intimated that she would be active in the role.

Chapman ran for a second term in November 2017, but the election was annulled after allegations that her supporters had torn down posters belonging to rival candidates, which Chapman and her campaign team denied. A document released by the University indicated that the election committee disagreed with the initial decision to annul the results as Chapman had not been given a right of reply to the allegations but did not overturn it. In the end, the election was re-run in February 2018. Chapman won re-election, defeating Aberdeen law student Israr Khan by a margin of 1,248 votes to 891.

Personal life
Her father, Neil Chapman, was a professional classical musician. She has a sister, Catherine. She plays the fiddle and enjoys exploring Scotland.

References

External links
 
 Maggie Chapman's blog
 Maggie Chapman's profile page on the Scottish Green Party's official website
 Recent posts by Maggie Chapman on the Scottish Green Party's official website

1979 births
Living people
Academics of Edinburgh Napier University
Alumni of Dominican Convent High School
Alumni of the University of Edinburgh
Alumni of the University of Stirling
Anti-war activists
Councillors in Edinburgh
Leaders of the Scottish Green Party
People from Harare
Rectors of the University of Aberdeen
Rhodesian people
Scottish Green Party councillors
Zimbabwean emigrants to the United Kingdom
Scottish Green Party MSPs
Members of the Scottish Parliament 2021–2026
Female members of the Scottish Parliament
Women councillors in Scotland